The Upper Zakum Oil Field  is an oil field 84 km northwest of Abu Dhabi Islands. It was discovered in 1963 and developed by Abu Dhabi Marine Areas Ltd., a joint venture between British Petroleum and Compagnie Française des Pétroles (later Total). The oil field is owned by Abu Dhabi National Oil Company and operated as part of ADNOC Offshore, formerly ZADCO.

The current 40% foreign interest is split between ExxonMobil which has a 28 percent stake, with Japan Oil Developing Co (Jodco) holding 12 percent.

There is a project close to completion to increase production to 750,000 bbl/day from Upper Zakum.

Upper Zakum and Lower Zakum together are the second largest offshore oilfield and fourth largest oilfield in the world.

References

External links

 Upper Zakum Oil Field Abu Dhabi

Oil fields of the United Arab Emirates